Emanuel Herrera (born 13 April 1987) is an Argentine footballer that currently plays for Universitario de Deportes as a striker.

Club career

Career in Argentina
Herrera was born in Rosario. Herrera began his football career at Chacarita Juniors. At 21, and without being able to impose in the first team, he left his first club Chacarita Juniors and was transferred to Sportivo Italiano in Buenos Aires but his stay in Buenos Aires where move to Patronato. His three seasons in Argentina are a failure with only 16 games in total without a goal.

Club Deportes Concepción
Herrera move to Chile by joining Concepción with the help of his agent. On 26 February 2011, Herrera made his debut for the club in a 2–0 win over Deportes Puerto Montt on the opening game of the season. On 5 March 2011, Herrera scored his first goal for the club against Lota Schwager. After 9 games without scoring, Herrera scored twice in a 4–1 win over Everton de Viña del Mar on 8 May 2011. 29 May 2011, Herrera scored twice in a 2–2 draw against C.S.D. Rangers. Herrera began scoring for the three weeks with a double against Club de Deportes Copiapó, Deportes Naval and San Marcos de Arica. After scoring 11 goals in the first half of the season, Herrera was able to be joint-top scorer along with Claudio Latorre, Ariel Roberto Pereyra and Cristian Milla.

Following the club lost in the final last year to Deportes Iquique, the club faced Club Universidad de Chile whether to take the third spot for the Copa Sudamericana. In the first leg in the playoffs for the third spot for the Copa Sudamericana in Club Deportes Concepció stadium, Herrera scored a brace in a 2–2 draw against Club Universidad de Chile on 27 July 2011. In the second leg in the playoffs for the third spot for the Copa Sudamericana Club Universidad de Chile (host) won 2–0, eliminating Club Deportes Concepción out of the Copa Sudamericana.

Despite the club lose the spot in the Copa Sudamericana, Herrera played strong in the league scoring 11 goal, being the scorer of the tournament. Towards the end of the season, Herrera scored 16 goals, tallying up in total of 27. But the team failed to qualified for the playoffs for promotion and placed third in the league, just two points behind Deportes Naval.

Unión Española

After the team failed to qualified for the playoffs for promotion, it confirmed the transfer on 13 December 2011 that Herrera will join Chilean Primera División side Unión Española, signing a five-year deal. On 25 January 2012, Herrera officially made his debut for the club in the Copa Libertadores First Stage of the first leg against Tigres and on 2 February 2012, he scored the first goal for the club in the match in the second leg which was 2–2, going through to the group stage. In the Copa Libertadores, Herrera would score 4 more against Junior de Barranquilla, Club Bolívar (scored again) and Club Deportivo Universidad Católica (all four goals come in the group stage). Herrera then provided assists in the Copa Libertadores in both leg against Boca Juniors which in both games lost. In the Copa Libertadores, Herrera entered in the competition scoring 5 goals in 10 games.

In the opening season of Chilean Primera División, Herrera scored on his debut in a 2–0 win over Audax Italiano on 29 January 2012. After 3 games without scoring, Herrera scored a brace in a 2–2 draw against Club Deportivo Universidad Católica on 26 February 2012 and scored in the next game on 3 March 2012 in a 3–1 win over C.D. Palestino which followed by the next game on 10 March 2012 in a 3–1 loss against CD Huachipato. On 24 March 2012, Herrera scored twice and setting up a goal for Fernando Cordero in a 5–2 win over Deportes La Serena. On 7 April 2012, Herrera scored and setting up a goal for Mauro Díaz in a 4–2 win over Colo-Colo. On 21 April 2012, Herrera scored in a 2–2 draw against Santiago Wanderers. On 28 April 2012, Herrera scored and setting up a goal for Braulio Leal in a 4–1 win over C.D. Universidad de Concepción. After scoring 10 goals in the regular season, Unión Española won the qualification for the final round to be in fifth place.

In the Play-Offs Primera División Apertura Quarter Final first leg against Club Deportivo Universidad Católica, Herrera scored and setting up a goal for Cordero in a 3–1 win which the second leg was 1–1 draw. At the end of Campeonato Apertura, Herrera was a joint-top scorer Sebastián Ubilla. During his time at Unión Española, Herrera earned the nickname 'El Tanque' due to his physical, dribbler and rather fast, it has the characteristic mark of the essential goals of the right foot. His first season at Unión Española led interests from French Champions Montpellier.

Montpellier
On 6 July 2012, Herrera officially signed for Montpellier for worth 3.5 million on a three-year deal. Herrera was presented in Montpellier's shirt and given number 11 shirt. His move was a replacement for Olivier Giroud who left for Arsenal in the summer. On his move, manager René Girard says Herrera drew comparison to Real Madrid and Argentinian striker Gonzalo Higuaín.

Herrera scored 4 goals for the last 5 games in the friendly matches. Herrera made his debut for the club in a competitive match at Trophée des Champions against Lyon on 28 July 2012 where he converted a penalty, scoring his first goal to make it 2–1. But Lyon managed to pull one back and the game played through until the penalty shootout and Montpellier lost 4–2. On 10 August 2012 in the opening game of Ligue 1 season, Herrera made his debut for the club in a 1–1 tie against Toulouse and he was replaced by John Utaka early in the second half He scored the following week against FC Lorient but Montpellier could not manage to get their first win of the season as the opposition scored two very late goals. He recently scored in a 3–2 away defeat to Marseille.

Tigres UANL
On 10 January 2014, Herrera arrived to Monterrey to sign a loan with Mexican outfit Tigres UANL. On 1 February 2014, Herrera made his official debut with Tigres playing the second half of the local derby against CF Monterrey in a game that finished in a 0–0 draw. On 4 February 2014, Herrera scored two goals in the Copa MX against Correcaminos UAT, at the Estadio Universitario. On 27 February 2014, Herrera scored a hat-trick against CF Puebla for a Copa MX game. On 25 March 2014, he scored a goal against Tiburones Rojos de Veracruz in the Copa MX semifinals. On 9 April 2014, Herrera played the finals of the 2014 Copa MX where Tigres beat Alebrijes de Oaxaca by 3–0 at the Estadio Universitario. In May 2014 his loan to Tigres UANL was finished.

Honours

Club
Tigres UANL
 Copa MX (1): Clausura 2014

References

External links
 

1987 births
Living people
Association football forwards
Argentine footballers
Argentine expatriate footballers
Footballers from Rosario, Santa Fe
Chacarita Juniors footballers
Club Atlético Patronato footballers
Deportes Concepción (Chile) footballers
Unión Española footballers
Montpellier HSC players
Tigres UANL footballers
C.S. Emelec footballers
FBC Melgar footballers
Lobos BUAP footballers
Sporting Cristal footballers
Argentinos Juniors footballers
Club Celaya footballers
Primera Nacional players
Primera B de Chile players
Chilean Primera División players
Ligue 1 players
Liga MX players
Ecuadorian Serie A players
Peruvian Primera División players
Argentine expatriate sportspeople in Chile
Argentine expatriate sportspeople in France
Argentine expatriate sportspeople in Ecuador
Argentine expatriate sportspeople in Mexico
Argentine expatriate sportspeople in Peru
Expatriate footballers in Chile
Expatriate footballers in France
Expatriate footballers in Ecuador
Expatriate footballers in Mexico
Expatriate footballers in Peru